The Washington County Courthouse in Springfield in Washington County, Kentucky is located on Springfield's Public Square, at Main at Lincoln Park Rd.  It was built during 1814–15.  It was listed on the National Register of Historic Places in 1977.

It is a two-story brick courthouse, with brick laid in Flemish bond.  Among other changes designed by architect Frank Brewer, it has an octagonal cupola added in 1840.

It is included as a contributing building in the Springfield Main Street Historic District.

References

Courthouses on the National Register of Historic Places in Kentucky
Georgian architecture in Kentucky
Government buildings completed in 1814
National Register of Historic Places in Washington County, Kentucky
County courthouses in Kentucky
1814 establishments in Kentucky
Buildings and structures in Springfield, Kentucky
Individually listed contributing properties to historic districts on the National Register in Kentucky